Albert Edward Pitt (born 1880) was an English footballer who played in the Football League for Stoke.

Career
Pitt started playing football with amateur side Stone Town before joining Stoke in 1903. He played a bit part role for Stoke and in 1905 he left to attend Birmingham University and then left for New Zealand. He returned to Stoke in 1908 and was a regular during the 1908–09 season before he then left the country again this time to Canada. He returned about a year later and played for Trentham, Wrexham and four more matches for Stoke.

Career statistics

References

English footballers
Stoke City F.C. players
Wrexham A.F.C. players
English Football League players
1880 births
Year of death missing
People from Shardlow
Footballers from Derbyshire
Association football defenders
Association football forwards